The five-toed emo skink or small keel-scaled skink (Emoia physicina) is a species of lizard in the family Scincidae. It is found in Papua New Guinea and Indonesia.

References

Emoia
Reptiles described in 1985
Reptiles of Papua New Guinea
Reptiles of Indonesia
Taxa named by Walter Creighton Brown
Taxa named by Frederick Stanley Parker
Skinks of New Guinea